Aché, also known as Guayaki, is a Guarani language of Paraguay. Aché has three living dialects: Ache gatu, Ache wa, and Ñacunday River Ache. The Ñacunday River dialect has low mutual intelligibility with the other two dialects.

Phonology

References

External links
 Listen to a sample of Aché from Global Recordings Network
 The Language Archive
 Aché (Intercontinental Dictionary Series)

Languages of Paraguay
Tupi–Guarani languages